The city of La Paz, in the region of Upper Peru (now Bolivia, then part of the Viceroyalty of the Río de la Plata), experienced a revolution in 1809 that deposed Spanish authorities and declared independence. It is considered one of the early steps of the Spanish American wars of independence, and an antecedent of the independence of Bolivia. However, the revolution was defeated shortly afterwards, and the city returned to Spanish rule.

Background
In 1781, for a total of six months, a group of Aymara people laid siege to La Paz. Under the leadership of Túpac Katari, they destroyed churches and government property. Despite the failure of the indigenous peoples’ plight, eventually crushed by the military alliance of Spanish and Creoles, thoughts of independence continued flourishing. Thirty years later indigenous people laid a two-month siege on La Paz – where and when the legend of the Ekeko is set.

It was not until the autumn of 1807 when Napoleon moved French troops through Spain to invade Portugal and with Spanish authority already fatally weakened, that the prospect of independence re-emerged in the native imagination. The United States’ independence in 1776 was certainly an inspirational example of empowered colonists deposing a despotic foreign rule. With Spanish authority deteriorating, as Charles IV renounced the throne in favor of Ferdinand VII (with the furious Carlists vs. Fernandists turmoil that ensued), and he in favor of Joseph Bonaparte, it was ripe for revolution.

Development
On July 16, in the city of La Paz, as celebrations for the Virgin of Carmen were enfolding, a group of revolutionaries led by Colonel Pedro Domingo Murillo and other individuals besieged the city barracks and forced the governor, Tadeo Davila and the Bishop of La Paz, Remigio de la Santa y Ortega, to resign. It was on July 16, 1809 that mestizo Pedro Domingo Murillo famously said that the Bolivian revolution was igniting a lamp that nobody would be able to extinguish. Many historians agree that this marked the beginning of the Liberation of South America from Spain. Political power went to the local cabildo until a "Junta Tuitiva de los Derechos del Pueblo" ("Junta, keeper of the rights of the people"), headed by Murillo, was formed. On July 27, the Junta proclaimed colonial independence.

José Manuel de Goyeneche, despite suspected of having Carlists sympathies, was called forward to lead royalist forces against the insurgents. While many revolutionaries enlisted and marched to Chacaltaya to await enemy troops, a counter-revolution headed by Pedro Indaburo broiled in the capital.

La Paz was defended by Murillo, who was able to maintain a military force of approximately 800 men.  Viceroy José Fernando de Abascal sent troops from Lima to repress the revolt and seized this opportunity to decree the reannexation of Upper Peru to his jurisdiction of Peru. Royalists there formed a clear majority, even among americanos. Elites in Lima, in particular, whose wealth and influence had declined since the Bourbon repartitioning of South America, placed their hopes not in the seemingly illusory promises of liberation but rather in the rewards they could secure through fidelity to the Crown. Murillo and the other leaders were beheaded and their heads exhibited to the people as deterrent.

See also

 Bolivian War of Independence
 Chuquisaca Revolution
 May Revolution
 History of Bolivia

References

Colonial Bolivia
1800s conflicts
Bolivian War of Independence
1800s in South America
19th-century revolutions
19th century in the Viceroyalty of the Río de la Plata
1809 in Bolivia
July 1809 events
History of La Paz